The playoff round of the 2018 IIHF World Championship was held from 17 to 20 May 2018. The top four-placed teams of each preliminary group qualified for the playoff round.

Qualified teams

Bracket

All times are local (UTC+2).

Quarterfinals

Semifinals

Bronze medal game

Gold medal game

References

External links
Official website

P